is a Japanese manga series written by Muneyuki Kaneshiro and illustrated by Kensuke Nishida. It was serialized in Shogakukan's Weekly Big Comic Spirits from February 2017 to November 2021, with its chapters collected in fourteen tankōbon volumes.

Publication
Written by Muneyuki Kaneshiro and illustrated by Kensuke Nishida, Jagaaan was serialized in Shogakukan's seinen manga magazine Weekly Big Comic Spirits from February 6, 2017, to November 8, 2021. Shogakukan collected its chapters in fourteen tankōbon volumes, released from May 30, 2017, to December 28, 2021.

The manga is licensed in France by Kazé.

Volume list

References

External links
 

Seinen manga
Shogakukan manga
Supernatural anime and manga